The 1916 uprising in Hilla or the Akif incident was an Arab uprising against the Ottoman Empire in 1916.

Background 
The Ottoman defeat in the Battle of Shaiba in April 1915 had damaged the authority of the Ottomans in the eyes of the Arabs, leading to an uprising in Najaf in May 1915. Following their victory, emissaries from Najaf began encouraging an uprising in Hilla.

Uprising 
The uprising in Hilla took place in November 1916. The Ottomans put up a desperate fight in the city but found themselves outnumbered by waves of Bedouin and deserters. After the rebels captured the city, the Ottomans sent a punitive force of 4,000-6,000 troops under ‘Ākif Beg. On the 11th, Ākif wrote a letter to Hillah, claiming that he needed to cross the city to get to Nasiriyah. He asked to meet the prominent people of the city to negotiate with them for permission to cross.  When the leaders of the city, such as Muhammad ‘Ali al-Qazwini and others, met them, the Ottomans detained them and declared to the inhabitants of the city that if their crossing through the city to Nasiriyah was opposed, they would kill their hostages.

Aftermath 
The residents abided by the Ottoman demands, but Akif reneged on his promise. Ottoman forces hung 128 or 126 people, carried of their women, and killed 1500 in all, as well as deporting "thousands" of people to Diyarbakır. This incident served to increase anti-Ottoman sentiment among Arab Shiites, some of whom came to Hilla to aid the rebels, but were too late.

Al-Fatlah chieftain Mudbir al-Far'un condemned the Ottoman massacre:

  
  
Muhammad ‘Ali al-Qazwini was spared by the Ottomans and lived until 1937.

References 

1916 in Ottoman Iraq
Battles of the Mesopotamian campaign
Battles of World War I involving the Ottoman Empire
Conflicts in 1916
Hillah
Arab rebellions in Iraq
November 1916 events
Hilla